The Salvo Post Office is a historic post office building located at Salvo, in Dare County, North Carolina, on the Outer Banks.  It was built about 1910, and is a small frame building measuring 8 feet by 12 feet (about 2.4 by 3.6 meters). The interior consists of the post office lobby and the postmaster's workroom.  It reflects a unique tradition of a portable building being purchased by succeeding postmasters and moved to their respective properties.  It is recognized by the U.S. Postal Service as the second-smallest post office building in the nation, after the Ochopee Post Office in Florida.  The building was restored after being damaged by fire in October 1992.

It was listed on the National Register of Historic Places in 1993.

References

Hatteras Island
Post office buildings on the National Register of Historic Places in North Carolina
Government buildings completed in 1910
Buildings and structures in Dare County, North Carolina
National Register of Historic Places in Dare County, North Carolina
1910 establishments in North Carolina